The 10.4 cm Feldkanone M. 15 was a heavy field gun used by Austria-Hungary in World War I. It was derived from the successful 15 cm schwere Feldhaubitze M 14 modified to fire high-velocity 104-mm projectiles.

Guns captured or turned over to Italy as reparations after World War I were taken into Italian service as the Cannone da 105/32 and were bored out to 105 mm to fit Italian ammunition. It was one of the principal Italian long-range guns in World War II and saw service in North Africa and Russia. Those few guns that were captured from the Italians by the Germans after the Italian surrender in 1943 were designated as 10.5 cm Kanone 320(i). It doesn't seem to have seen service with any of the Austro-Hungarian successor states after World War I.

Because the gun was too heavy to be drawn by the usual field artillery team of six hoses, for transport it broke down into the two loads, with the barrel being carried on a separate carriage.

An example of one of the transport wagons is preserved at Brisbane Grammar School in Queensland, Australia, which had been taken from the Ottoman Army at the Capture of Jenin in 1918 and was donated to the school in 1921 by Brigadier General Lachlan Chisholm Wilson, a former pupil. The barrel is mounted on its Rohrwagen or transport carriage rather than the gun carriage it would have been fired from. It was restored in 1996 by the South Queensland Logistics Group.

Four guns were used by Poland during the Polish-Soviet war 1919-1920.

A rusting 10.4 cm Skoda was found in the Presanella mountains in the year 2000, where it supposed it was dueling an Italian 149/23 during the First World War. Found at 3171 meters altitude, the gun came completely out of the glacier in the very warm summer of 2003. Because it was located on a 45 degree slope, the risk of it sliding down was considered too great, so the gun was relocated by lifting it with a Superpuma helicopter.

Notes

Bibliography
 Gander, Terry and Chamberlain, Peter. Weapons of the Third Reich: An Encyclopedic Survey of All Small Arms, Artillery and Special Weapons of the German Land Forces 1939-1945. New York: Doubleday, 1979 
 Ortner, M. Christian. The Austro-Hungarian Artillery From 1867 to 1918: Technology, Organization, and Tactics. Vienna, Verlag Militaria, 2007 
 http://www.regioesercito.it/armi/104-32.htm

External links

 Cannone da 105/32 on Italie 1935-1945
 http://old.vhu.cz/cs/stranka/sbirkovefondy%2520vhu/10-4cm-polni-kanon-vz--15-&usg=ALkJrhiZc9vZe1HfpsTh6l0Ado5M4sZM6w

 

World War I guns
World War I artillery of Italy
World War I artillery of Austria-Hungary
104 mm artillery